Anderson Nathael Duarte da Silva (born 23 March 2004) is a Uruguayan professional footballer who plays as a forward for Defensor Sporting.

Club career
Duarte is a youth academy graduate of Defensor Sporting. He made his professional debut for the club on 10 November 2021 in a 2–0 league win against Uruguay Montevideo.

International career
Duarte is a Uruguayan youth international. He has represented Uruguay at 2019 South American U-15 Championship.

Career statistics

Honours
Defensor Sporting
 Copa Uruguay: 2022

References

External links
 

2004 births
Living people
People from Tacuarembó
Association football forwards
Uruguayan footballers
Uruguayan Segunda División players
Defensor Sporting players